Peter Munch Brager (3 January 1806 – March 1869) was a Norwegian priest and politician.

He was elected to the Parliament of Norway in 1845, representing the constituency of Finmarkens Amt. He only served one term.

At that time he was a parish priest in Lenvig; he was later appointed parish priest in Øiestad. His son Olmar Ambrosio Nikolai Brager followed in his footsteps as a parish priest.

References

1806 births
1869 deaths
Members of the Storting
Finnmark politicians
Norwegian priest-politicians